The sixth USS Eagle (SP-145), later renamed USS SP-145, was an armed motorboat that served in the United States Navy as a patrol vessel from 1917 to 1919.
 
Eagle was built as a civilian motorboat in 1909 by J. M. Bayles and Son at Port Jefferson, New York. The U.S. Navy acquired her from her owner, Colonel William Hester of Brooklyn, New York, on 2 May 1917 for use as a patrol vessel during World War I. She was commissioned on 10 September 1917 as USS Eagle (SP-145).

Eagle was assigned to the 3rd Naval District, and spent her naval career in the New York City area. She was renamed USS SP-145 in April 1918 to avoid confusion with the gunboat USS Eagle, which was in commission at the same time. (Note that neither of these ships should be confused with patrol boat USS Eaglet (SP-909), also in commission at the time.)

SP-145 was stricken from the Navy List on 11 March 1919 and sold on 25 June 1919.

Notes

References
Department of the Navy Naval Historical Center Online Library of Selected Images: U.S. Navy Ships: USS Eagle (SP-145), 1917-1919. Later renamed SP-145. Formerly the Civilian Motor Boat Eagle (1909)
NavSource Online: Section Patrol Craft Photo Archive: SP-145 ex-Eagle (SP 145)

Patrol vessels of the United States Navy
World War I patrol vessels of the United States
Ships built in New York (state)
1909 ships